Stachyra is a Polish-language surname. Originally it was a given name derived from the name Stanislaw, diminutive: Stach.  Notable people with the surname include:

Kamil Stachyra (born 1987), Polish footballer
Michał Stachyra (born 1978), Polish game designer and publisher

See also
 
 Stachura (surname)

References

Polish-language surnames